Coccothrinax pseudorigida is a palm which is endemic to east central Cuba.

Henderson and colleagues (1995) considered C. pseudorigida to be a synonym of Coccothrinax pauciramosa.

References

pseudorigida
Trees of Cuba
Plants described in 1939